Tahnoun Al Nahyan may refer to:

Tahnun bin Shakhbut Al Nahyan (died 1833), ruler of Abu Dhabi
Tahnoun bin Zayed bin Khalifa Al Nahyan (1857–1912), ruler of Abu Dhabi
Tahnoun bin Zayed Al Nahyan (national security advisor) (born 1968), Emirati politician and business executive